Under the Carpet is a 2021 Nigerian romantic drama film written and directed by Tope Alake. The film stars Iyabo Ojo, Deyemi Okanlawon and Tana Adelana in the lead roles. The film was premiered on 7 March 2021 at the IMAX Cinema and had its theatrical release on 12 March 2021.

Cast 

 Iyabo Ojo
 Deyemi Okanlawon
 Tana Adelana
 Femi Jacobs
 Lydia Lawrence Nze
 Tosin Abiola
 Roxy Antak

References 

English-language Nigerian films
Nigerian romantic drama films
2021 romantic drama films
2020s English-language films